S.C. Michela Fanini Rox was a professional cycling team based in Italy, which competes in elite road bicycle racing events such as the UCI Women's Road World Cup and elite road races.

Team history

2014

Riders in
On November 4, Eyerusalem Dino Kelin, Lara Vieceli, Michela Balducci, Frederica Nicolai and Azzurra D'Intino signed contract extensions. On November 5 Vittoria Reati joined the team. On November 13 Francesca Balducci joined the team. On December 1, Alessandra Lari signed with the team. On December 12 Laura Lozano joined the team.

Riders out
On November 13 Vittoria Bussi left the team to join Servetto Footon.

Team roster

Previous squads

2014

2013
Ages as of 1 January 2013.

2012
Ages as of 1 January 2012.

2011
Ages as of 1 January 2011.

Major Results

1999
Trofeo Alfredo Binda – Comune di Cittiglio, Fany Lecourtois
2002
 GP Castilla y Leon, Regina Schleicher
 GP Ouest France, Regina Schleicher
2004
 Stage 2 Bay Cycling Classic, Hayley Brown-Rutherford
 Stage 1 Emakumeen Euskal Bira, Katia Longhin
 Stage 2 Giro d'Italia Donne, Edita Pučinskaitė
 GP Carnevale d'Europa, Nicole Brändli
 Overall Trophée d'Or Féminin, Edita Pučinskaitė
 Stages 2 & 5, Katia Longhin
 Stage 4, Edita Pučinskaitė
 GP Ouest France, Edita Pučinskaitė
 Stage 2Giro della Toscana Int. Femminile, Edita Pučinskaitė
2005
Stage 1 Central Valley Classic, Annette Beutler
General classification Joe Martin Stage Race, Lynn Gaggioli-Brotzman
Stage 1, Lynn Gaggioli-Brotzman
Stage 3 Tour du Grand Montréal, Annette Beutler
2006
Stages 1 & 2 Eko Tour Dookola Polski, Annalisa Cucinotta
Stage 3 Eko Tour Dookola Polski, Karin Aune
2007
Skandis GP, Sara Mustonen
Falu, Sara Mustonen
Stage 1 Tour de Pologne Feminin, Grete Treier
Stage 3 Laxå 3-dagars, Sara Mustonen
Solleröloppet, Sara Mustonen
 Soldvarvi GP, Sara Mustonen
Overall Söderhamns 3-dagars, Sara Mustonen
Stages 1a, 1b & 2 part a Söderhamns 3-dagars, Sara Mustonen
2010
Stage 2 Tour Féminin en Limousin, Edwige Pitel
2011
Overall Vuelta Feminina a Guatemala, Verónica Leal Balderas
Stage 1, Verónica Leal Balderas
Overall Tour Féminin en Limousin, Grete Treier
2012
Overall Tour of Adygeya, Alexandra Burchenkova
Stage 2, Alexandra Burchenkova
2018
Horizon Park Women Challenge, Yevgenia Vysotska
Stage 5 Vuelta a Colombia Femenina, Lilibeth Chacón

National champions

2007
 Estonia Time Trial, Grete Treier
 Estonia Road Race, Grete Treier
 Sweden Road Race, Sara Mustonen
2009
  Italy Road Race, Monia Baccaille
2010
 Ukraine Road Race, Nina Ovcharenko
2011
 Estonia Time Trial, Grete Treier
 Estonia Road Race, Grete Treier
 Mexico Time Trial Verónica Leal Balderas
 Israel National Road Race, Ellah Michal
2012
 Estonia Time Trial, Grete Treier
 Estonia Road Race, Grete Treier
2013
 Estonia Time Trial, Liisi Rist
 Estonia Road Race, Liisi Rist
2014
 Ukraine Time Trial, Tetyana Ryabchenko
 Estonia Time Trial, Liisi Rist
 Estonia Road Race, Liisi Rist
2015
 Ethiopia Time Trial, Eyerusalem Kelil
2016
 Ethiopia Time Trial, Eyerusalem Kelil
 France Road Race, Edwige Pitel 
 Hungary Road Race, Mónika Király 
 Hungary Time Trial, Mónika Király 
2017
 Hungary Time Trial, Mónika Király 
 Hungary Road Race, Mónika Király
2018
 Ukraine Road Race, Olga Shekel

References

Cycling teams based in Italy
UCI Women's Teams
Cycling teams established in 1999
1999 establishments in Italy